Choi Kiwoon is a theoretical particle physicist researching focusing on particle theory and cosmology. He was a research professor at Chonbuk National University and a full professor at KAIST. He is the founding director of the Institute for Basic Science Center for Theoretical Physics of the Universe. He is a member of the Korean Academy of Science and Technology.

Education 
Choi received his B.S., M.S. and Ph.D. in physics from Seoul National University in 1981, 1983, and 1986, respectively.

Career
Moving to the United States, Choi started his career as a visiting postdoctoral research associate at Harvard in 1986. Next he was postdoctoral research associate at Johns Hopkins University in 1987, Carnegie Mellon from 1988 to 1990, and UC San Diego from 1990 to 1992. Returning to Korea, the next two years were spent as a research professor at Chonbuk National University. A majority of his career was in KAIST in Daejeon, starting as an assistant professor in 1994, associate professor in 1996, and full professor from 2001. Leaving KAIST, he became the founding director of the Center for Theoretical Physics of the Universe (CTPU), established November 2013. Research at CTPU focuses on physics beyond the Standard Model, including understanding the fundamental theoretical frameworks of physics and investigating the origin of the universe through particle physics.

Honors and awards 
 2011: Korea Science Award, Ministry of Science, ICT and Future Planning and National Research Foundation of Korea
 2007: National Scholar, Ministry of Education and Human Resources Development and Korea Academic Promotion Foundation
 2007: Scientific Citation Laureate Award, Thomson Scientific and Korea Science and Engineering Foundation

References

Publications

External links 
 Kiwoon Choi - Google Scholar

South Korean physicists
Seoul National University alumni
Living people
1959 births
Academic staff of KAIST
Institute for Basic Science
South Korean scientists